Indiramma or Integrated Novel Development In Rural Areas and Model Municipal Areas (INDIRAMMA) is a mass housing scheme introduced by the Government of Andhra Pradesh. It covers people living in rural areas in the state of Andhra Pradesh.

History
It started in the year 2006 when Y. S. Rajasekhara Reddy was the Chief Minister of Andhra Pradesh and aimed to make the state Hut-free.

The Scheme
The scheme provides funds to the people below poverty line. The government support in 2013 stands at

- open category (upper castes) and Backward Classes from Rs 45,000 to Rs 70,000 in rural areas and from Rs 55,000 to Rs 80,000 in urban areas

- SC/ST it is Rs 1.2 lakh in Urban and rural areas

References

External links
 Official site

Housing in India
Government welfare schemes in Andhra Pradesh